David Cameron Chatters (April 15, 1946 – January 25, 2016) was a Canadian politician. He was a member of the House of Commons of Canada from 1993 to 2006, representing the riding of Athabasca until the 2004 election, after which he represented Westlock—St. Paul.

Born in Westlock, Alberta, Chatters, formerly a farmer and rancher, was first elected as a member of the Reform Party of Canada (1993–2000), which became the Canadian Alliance in 2000, which became the Conservative Party of Canada in 2003. For over 10 years, he was the Senior Opposition Critic for Natural Resources and was a Deputy Whip of the Official Opposition. He was the Chair of the Standing Committee on Access to Information, Privacy, and Ethics, but health reasons made Chatters retire at the 2006 election.

In May 1996, he was suspended from the Reform Party caucus for asserting, in the wake of the Delwin Vriend case on LGBT human rights, that schools should have the right to fire openly gay teachers. Another caucus colleague who had made a similar comment, Bob Ringma, was suspended at the same time; a third caucus colleague, Jan Brown, was also suspended at the same time for publicly criticizing Chatters and Ringma. All three were readmitted to the Reform caucus by September of that year. He died at the age of 69 on January 25, 2016. He had pancreatic cancer.

Electoral record

References

External links
How'd They Vote?: David Chatters' voting history and quotes
 

1946 births
2016 deaths
Members of the House of Commons of Canada from Alberta
Reform Party of Canada MPs
Canadian Alliance MPs
Conservative Party of Canada MPs
People from Westlock County
21st-century Canadian politicians
Deaths from pancreatic cancer